Schettino is an Italian surname. Notable people with the surname include:

 Alberto Schettino (born 1984), Italian footballer
 Bruno Schettino (19412012), Italian Roman Catholic archbishop
 Francesco Schettino (born 1960), Italian sea captain during the Costa Concordia disaster and convicted criminal
 Raphael Tessaro Schettino (born 1985), Brazilian footballer

Italian-language surnames